Taninthayi Region Hluttaw is the legislature of the Burmese region of Taninthayi Region in Myanmar. It is a unicameral body, consisting of 28 members, including 21 elected members and 7 military representatives.  As of February 2016, the Hluttaw was led by speaker Khin Maung Aye of the National League for Democracy (NLD).

As of the 2015 general election, the National League for Democracy (NLD) won every contested seat in the legislature, based on the most recent election results.

General Election results (Nov. 2015)

See also
State and Region Hluttaws
Pyidaungsu Hluttaw

References

Unicameral legislatures
Tanintharyi Region
Legislatures of Burmese states and regions